Ginebis japonica is a species of sea snail, a marine gastropod mollusk in the family Eucyclidae.

Description
The shell grows to a height of 35 mm.

Distribution
This marine species occurs off Japan.

References

External links
 To Encyclopedia of Life
 To World Register of Marine Species
 

japonica
Gastropods described in 1925